1995–96 Amateur championship of Ukraine was the fourth amateur championship of Ukraine and the 32nd since the establishment of championship among fitness clubs (KFK) in 1964. The format of competitions was preserved as in the Soviet competitions where there was six independent groups split by regional principal. Compare to the last season competitions, number of participating teams were cut about trifold from 91 to 26.

Teams

Location map

Composition

Group 1

Group 2

Notes:
 Games ENKO-Svitanok 1:2 and Svitanok-Zoria 1:1 were annulled.

Group 3

Group 4

Group 5

Group 6

External links
 Information on the competition

Ukrainian Football Amateur League seasons
4
Ukra